Pacific Daydream is the eleventh studio album by American rock band Weezer, released on October 27, 2017. The album is their second release by Crush Management, is distributed by Atlantic Records, and is trademarked by a modern pop sound, differing from their previous work. The lead single, "Feels Like Summer", was released on March 16, 2017. The second single, "Happy Hour", was released on October 31.

Background and recording
In 2016, frontman Rivers Cuomo began filling a folder of songs intended for a darker project (provisionally titled The Black Album) but ultimately completed a second folder with songs that were of a different nature first, leading to the creation of Pacific Daydream. In April, Cuomo teased the album, describing it as "Beach Boys gone bad", tackling "more mature topics" and "less summer day and more winter night". As Cuomo began writing and recording, they found the songs to be more "like reveries from a beach at the end of the world [... as if] the Beach Boys and The Clash fell in love by the ocean and had one hell of an amazing baby". The band ultimately pushed back plans for The Black Album and began focusing on the new collection of songs. Guitarist Brian Bell later said "Whatever it's going to be called, it's going to be fucking awesome." Inspired by an ancient Chinese proverb by Chuang Chou, Cuomo hoped to explore more "radical" sounds, a departure from the "classic" style of The White Album. Cuomo's original title for the album was Somebody's Daydream, but he later explained that the band's drummer, Pat Wilson, thought "Pacific" was a more attractive alternative than "Somebody's", and ultimately the group settled on Pacific Daydream.

To create the album, Cuomo utilized various musical and lyrical fragments he had collected over time. He kept an archive of song ideas and hired programmers to organize a spreadsheet of lyric snippets by beats per minute, syllable, and key to call from whenever stuck. "Instead of trying to force myself to feel inspired, I can just go into the spreadsheet and search [...] I just try them out to see which ones work magically."

Writing and composition

Songs
Cuomo has described the album as having an overall theme of "alienation and loneliness and not feeling like I have a place to fit in", describing it as having a "darker, sadder undertone to it relative to" their previous album. The album's opening track, "Mexican Fender", written by Cuomo and Toby Gad, was based on Cuomo's interactions with Katy Goodman, of the indie rock band La Sera. Cuomo credited Jake Sinclair, the producer for The White Album, in assisting with the creation of the track. "Beach Boys", an ode to the Beach Boys, was written specifically to sound "the least like [them]", and describes Cuomo's experiences of "being in downtown LA at night and being totally disoriented and alienated". The song's bridge features quotes from Murry Wilson, the father of the Beach Boys' Brian Wilson. The album's lead single, "Feels Like Summer", is an "EDM-infused" track about "the death of [Cuomo's] June bride", who's now "home with the angels." The track was written through a "cut-and-paste" style that Cuomo had adopted while writing for The White Album. 
"Weekend Woman", the album's third promotional single, features an opening nod to The Zombies' "Time of the Season", as well as a verse melody previously used in a Green Album outtake, "Burning Sun".

Music
John Pareles of The New York Times called the album a "collection of pop-rock songs with old-fashioned verse-chorus-bridge structures", while Derek Rossignol of Uproxx stated that, with Pacific Daydream, "the band has proven that they’re still capable purveyors of sunny and bright alternative rock". Alex Hudson of Exclaim! stated that the album attempts to carry on the band's signature power pop style, while adding more electronic production. Andrew Trendell of NME asserted that "'Pacific Daydream' is all carefree, expertly crafted pop, free of irony and all the better for it".

Release and promotion
On March 16, 2017, the band released the album's first single, "Feels Like Summer". On August 17, the band unveiled the album art, title, and opening track, "Mexican Fender", as well as its accompanying music video. Another promotional single, "Beach Boys", was released on September 14. "Happy Hour" was the album's second official single, released on October 31, 2017.

Reception

Commercial
Pacific Daydream debuted at number 23 on the Billboard 200, which made it the lowest debut performance for a Weezer studio album since their 1994 debut. It is also the band's first album since 1996's Pinkerton to fail to debut in the top 10.

Critical

According to Metacritic, Pacific Daydream has received an aggregated score of 64/100, based on 21 reviews, indicating "generally favorable reviews". Jake Kilroy of Consequence of Sound describes it as "a strong album, but not a strong Weezer album", adding "But if you ever wanted to hear Weezer at their professionally sharpest, this is surely it. It's no surprise that Cuomo is a fan of pop smashes like Carly Rae Jepsen's 'Call Me Maybe', as Pacific Daydream might be more Train than Ozma...For the band to be at its full potential, though, the songwriter needs to reflect more on the takeaways of experiences rather than the moments themselves." Andrew Trendell at NME opined that aging has not worn Weezer down, stating "Pacific Daydream is all carefree, expertly crafted pop, free of irony and all the better for it. Lock the doors, crack open a cold one, and enjoy an endless summer with Weezer."

Saby Reyes-Kulkarni from Pitchfork was more critical of the album, noting "for the second album in a row, Cuomo anchors the music more specifically to California. Sure, that's worked for scores of artists in the past, but a crucial part of Weezer's appeal was that you could believe they came out of any garage on any tree-lined cul-de-sac in any suburban zip code in the U.S. Pacific Daydream, in spite of its name, mostly just gives you a feeling of being nowhere."

Accolades
The album received a Grammy Award nomination for Best Rock Album at the 61st Annual Grammy Awards.

Track listing
All tracks produced by Butch Walker except where noted.

Track notes
  signifies a co-producer

Personnel

Weezer
Brian Bell
Rivers Cuomo
Scott Shriner
Patrick Wilson

Additional musicians
 Butch Walker – additional guitar, synth, percussion, and backing vocals
 Daniel Brummel – acoustic guitar, slide guitar, piano, clarinet, percussion, and horn arrangement on "Sweet Mary"
 Ihui Wu – trumpet on "Sweet Mary"
 Josh Alexander – piano on "Sweet Mary"

Production
 Butch Walker – producer and engineer 
 Jonny Coffer – producer 
 J.R. Rotem – co-producer 
 Oh, Hush! – additional production 
 Todd Stopera – engineer 
 Suzy Shinn – engineer 
 Eric Valentine – mixing , mastering
 Tony Maserati – mixing

Charts

References

External links
 The Chuang-tzu, translated by Lin Yutang

2017 albums
Albums produced by Jake Sinclair (musician)
Albums produced by J. R. Rotem
Atlantic Records albums
Weezer albums